Eric Mullins (born July 30, 1962) is a former American football wide receiver. He played for the Houston Oilers in 1984.

References

1962 births
Living people
American football wide receivers
Stanford Cardinal football players
Houston Oilers players